Kabos is a surname. Notable people with the surname include:

Eduard Kabos (1864–1923), Hungarian journalist, dramatist and writer
Endre Kabos (1906–1944), Hungarian sabre fencer
Gyula Kabos (1887–1941), Hungarian actor and comedian
Ilona Kabos (1893–1973), Hungarian-British pianist and teacher

See also 
180824 Kabos, Asteroid